Jennings Glacier is a glacier,  long, flowing north along the west side of the Luncke Range in the Sør Rondane Mountains of Antarctica. It was mapped by Norwegian cartographers in 1957 from air photos taken by U.S. Navy Operation Highjump, 1946–47, and named for Lieutenant Joe C. Jennings, U.S. Navy, a co-pilot and navigator on Operation Highjump photographic flights of this and other coastal areas between 14°E and 164°E.

See also
 List of glaciers in the Antarctic
 Glaciology

References

 

Glaciers of Queen Maud Land
Princess Ragnhild Coast